George Rivers Blanco White QC (8 May 1883 – 26 March 1966) was an English judge, Recorder of Croydon from 1940–56, and a member of the Special Divorce Commission, from 1948–1957.

The son of Thomas and Margaret Elizabeth Blanco White, he was educated at St Paul's School, London and Trinity College, Cambridge, from where he graduated second wrangler behind Arthur Eddington in 1904, and was awarded Smith's Prize in 1906. He was called to the bar at Lincoln's Inn in 1907.

On 7 May 1909, he married Amber Reeves, feminist writer, scholar and campaigner. She was the daughter of William Pember Reeves and his wife Maud Pember Reeves. She bore a daughter Anna-Jane in December that year whose biological father was the author H.G. Wells (though Blanco White was Anna's legal father). The Blanco-Whites later had daughter Margaret Justin Blanco White (1911–2001), who became an architect, and a son Thomas Blanco White (1915–2006), a patent lawyer. Through Margaret he was the grandfather of anthropologist Caroline Humphrey and mathematician Dusa McDuff.

He served in the First World War with the Royal Garrison Artillery. He stood for the Labour Party at the 1929 Holland with Boston by-election, coming second to Liberal James Blindell.

He was made King's Counsel in 1936.  He became a Bencher of Lincoln's Inn in 1940 in replacement of Henry Chartres Biron.  He died in 1966 and received obituaries in The Times and The Guardian.

References 

1883 births
1966 deaths
20th-century English judges
Alumni of Trinity College, Cambridge
Labour Party (UK) parliamentary candidates
Place of birth missing
Place of death missing
English King's Counsel
20th-century King's Counsel
Members of the Fabian Society
Members of Lincoln's Inn
People educated at St Paul's School, London
Royal Garrison Artillery officers
20th-century English lawyers
Reeves family